Zuyevka is a rural locality (a village) in Urgushevsky Selsoviet, Karaidelsky District, Bashkortostan, Russia. The population was 107 as of 2010. There are 3 streets.

Geography 
Zuyevka is located 33 km southwest of Karaidel (the district's administrative centre) by road. Urgush is the nearest rural locality.

References 

Rural localities in Karaidelsky District